The 1851 Connecticut gubernatorial election was held on April 7, 1851. It was a rematch of the 1850 Connecticut gubernatorial election. Incumbent governor and Democratic Party nominee Thomas H. Seymour defeated former state legislator and Whig nominee Lafayette S. Foster with 48.94% of the vote. 

Seymour won a plurality of the vote, but he did not receive a majority. As a result, the Connecticut General Assembly elected the governor, per the state constitution. The Whig Party had a majority in the Connecticut State house, but they were divided over their choice. Seymour won the vote over Foster by a mere one-vote margin, 122 to 121, in the General Assembly, and became the governor.

General election

Candidates
Major party candidates

Thomas H. Seymour, Democratic
Lafayette S. Foster, Whig

Minor party candidates

John Boyd, Free Soil

Results

References

1851
Connecticut
Gubernatorial